Heyboer is a surname. Notable people with the surname include:

André Heyboer (born 1971), French contemporary baritone
Anton Heyboer (1924–2005), Dutch painter and printmaker
Laura Heyboer (born 1989), American soccer player